Type M or M type may refer to:

Science and technology
 Type M, a xD-Picture Card
 Type M, a name for the 15 amp BS 546 electrical plug
 Vaio Type M, a kind of Vaio computer from Sony
 M-type asteroid
 m-type filter, an electronic filter
 M-type star
 M-types, an implementation of inductive type

Other uses
 Audi Type M, a 1920s car
 Beretta 92FS Compact Type M, a pistol
 MG M-type, a sports car

See also
 M class (disambiguation)
 Class M (disambiguation)